The siege of Genoa took place in 1747 when an Austrian army under the command of Count Schulenburg launched a failed attempt to capture the capital of the Republic of Genoa. 

The Austrians had captured and then lost Genoa the previous year and made it the central objective of their strategy for 1747 before they would consider further operations against Naples or an invasion of France. Schulenburg's force reached the outskirts of the city in April, but realising they needed more troops they waited until twelve battalions of infantry from their Sardinian allies arrived in June. The delay allowed the French and Spanish to send reinforcements to the city under  to bolster the garrison. 

The approach of a Franco-Spanish force under Marshal Belle-Isle and General Las Minas pressured the Sardinians to withdraw to try to defend a possible threat to Milan, and Schulenberg then abandoned the siege blaming the Sardinians. The failed siege led to recriminations between Vienna and Turin with both complaining to their British allies in London about the alleged betrayal of the other.

References

Bibliography
 Lodge, Sir Richard. Studies in Eighteenth Century Diplomacy 1740-1748. John Murray, 1930.

Sieges of the War of the Austrian Succession
1747
Siege
1747 in the Republic of Genoa
Conflicts in 1747
Sieges involving France
Sieges involving Spain
Events in Genoa